Aluminium or aluminum (13Al) has 22 known isotopes from 22Al to 43Al and 4 known isomers. Only 27Al (stable isotope) and 26Al (radioactive isotope, t1/2 = ) occur naturally, however 27Al comprises nearly all natural aluminium. Other than 26Al, all radioisotopes have half-lives under 7 minutes, most under a second. Aluminium isotopes have found practical application in dating marine sediments, manganese nodules, glacial ice, quartz in rock exposures, and meteorites. The ratio of 26Al to 10Be has been used to study the role of sediment transport, deposition, and storage, as well as burial times, and erosion, on 105 to 106 year time scales. 26Al has also played a significant role in the study of meteorites.

List of isotopes 

|-
| rowspan=4|22Al
| rowspan=4 style="text-align:right" | 13
| rowspan=4 style="text-align:right" | 9
| rowspan=4|22.01954(43)#
| rowspan=4|91.1(5) ms
| β+, p (55%)
| 21Na
| rowspan=4|(4)+
| rowspan=4|
| rowspan=4|
|-
| β+ (43.862%)
| 22Mg
|-
| β+, 2p (1.1%)
| 20Ne
|-
| β+, α (0.038%)
| 18Ne
|-
| rowspan=2|23Al
| rowspan=2 style="text-align:right" | 13
| rowspan=2 style="text-align:right" | 10
| rowspan=2|23.0072444(4)
| rowspan=2|470(30) ms
| β+ (99.54%)
| 23Mg
| rowspan=2|5/2+
| rowspan=2|
| rowspan=2|
|-
| β+, p (0.46%)
| 22Na
|-
| rowspan=3|24Al
| rowspan=3 style="text-align:right" | 13
| rowspan=3 style="text-align:right" | 11
| rowspan=3|23.99994754(25)
| rowspan=3|2.053(4) s
| β+ (99.9634%)
| 24Mg
| rowspan=3|4+
| rowspan=3|
| rowspan=3|
|-
| β+, α (.035%)
| 20Ne
|-
| β+, p (.0016%)
| 23Na
|-
| rowspan=3 style="text-indent:1em" | 24mAl
| rowspan=3 colspan="3" style="text-indent:2em" | 425.8(1) keV
| rowspan=3|130(3) ms
| IT (82.5%)
| 24Al
| rowspan=3|1+
| rowspan=3|
| rowspan=3|
|-
| β+ (17.5%)
| 24Mg
|-
| β+, α (.028%)
| 20Ne
|-
| 25Al
| style="text-align:right" | 13
| style="text-align:right" | 12
| 24.99042831(7)
| 7.183(12) s
| β+
| 25Mg
| 5/2+
|
|
|-
| rowspan=2 | 26Al
| rowspan=2 style="text-align:right" | 13
| rowspan=2 style="text-align:right" | 13
| rowspan=2 | 25.98689186(7)
| rowspan=2 | 7.17(24)×105 y
| β+ (85%)
| rowspan=2| 26Mg
| rowspan=2| 5+
| rowspan=2| Trace
| rowspan=2|
|-
| ε (15%)
|-
| style="text-indent:1em" | 26mAl
| colspan="3" style="text-indent:2em" | 228.306(13) keV
| 6.3460(8) s
| β+
| 26Mg
| 0+
|
|
|-
| 27Al
| style="text-align:right" | 13
| style="text-align:right" | 14
| 26.98153841(5)
| colspan="3" style="text-align:center;"|Stable
| 5/2+
| 1.0000
|
|-
| 28Al
| style="text-align:right" | 13
| style="text-align:right" | 15
| 27.98191009(8)
| 2.245(5) min
| β−
| 28Si
| 3+
|
|
|-
| 29Al
| style="text-align:right" | 13
| style="text-align:right" | 16
| 28.9804532(4)
| 6.56(6) min
| β−
| 29Si
| 5/2+
|
|
|-
| 30Al
| style="text-align:right" | 13
| style="text-align:right" | 17
| 29.982968(3)
| 3.62(6) s
| β−
| 30Si
| 3+
|
|
|-
| rowspan=2|31Al
| rowspan=2 style="text-align:right" | 13
| rowspan=2 style="text-align:right" | 18
| rowspan=2|30.9839498(24)
| rowspan=2|644(25) ms
| β− (98.4%)
| 31Si
| rowspan=2|5/2(+)
| rowspan=2|
| rowspan=2|
|-
| β−, n (1.6%)
| 30Si
|-
| rowspan=2|32Al
| rowspan=2 style="text-align:right" | 13
| rowspan=2 style="text-align:right" | 19
| rowspan=2|31.988084(8)
| rowspan=2|33.0(2) ms
| β− (99.3%)
| 32Si
| rowspan=2|1+
| rowspan=2|
| rowspan=2|
|-
| β−, n (.7%)
| 31Si
|-
| style="text-indent:1em" | 32mAl
| colspan="3" style="text-indent:2em" | 955.7(4) keV
| 200(20) ns
| IT
| 32Al
| (4+)
|
|
|-
| rowspan=2|33Al
| rowspan=2 style="text-align:right" | 13
| rowspan=2 style="text-align:right" | 20
| rowspan=2|32.990878(8)
| rowspan=2|41.7(2) ms
| β− (91.5%)
| 33Si
| rowspan=2|5/2+
| rowspan=2|
| rowspan=2|
|-
| β−, n (8.5%)
| 32Si
|-
| rowspan=2|34Al
| rowspan=2 style="text-align:right" | 13
| rowspan=2 style="text-align:right" | 21
| rowspan=2|33.996779(3)
| rowspan=2|56.3(5) ms
| β− (74%)
| 34Si
| rowspan=2|(4−)
| rowspan=2|
| rowspan=2|
|-
| β−, n (26%)
| 33Si
|-
| rowspan=2 style="text-indent:1em" | 34mAl
| rowspan=2 colspan="3" style="text-indent:2em" | 550(100)# keV
| rowspan=2|26(1) ms
| β− (70%)
| 34Si
| rowspan=2|(1+)
| rowspan=2|
| rowspan=2|
|-
| β−, n (30%)
| 33Si
|-
| rowspan=2|35Al
| rowspan=2 style="text-align:right" | 13
| rowspan=2 style="text-align:right" | 22
| rowspan=2|34.999760(8)
| rowspan=2|37.2(8) ms
| β− (62%)
| 35Si
| rowspan=2|5/2+#
| rowspan=2|
| rowspan=2|
|-
| β−, n (38%)
| 34Si
|-
| rowspan=2|36Al
| rowspan=2 style="text-align:right" | 13
| rowspan=2 style="text-align:right" | 23
| rowspan=2|36.00639(16)
| rowspan=2|90(40) ms
| β− (70%)
| 36Si
| rowspan=2|
| rowspan=2|
| rowspan=2|
|-
| β−, n (30%)
| 35Si
|-
| rowspan=2|37Al
| rowspan=2 style="text-align:right" | 13
| rowspan=2 style="text-align:right" | 24
| rowspan=2|37.01053(19)
| rowspan=2|11.5(4) ms
| β− (71%)
| 37Si
| rowspan=2|5/2+#
| rowspan=2|
| rowspan=2|
|-
| β−, n (29%)
| 36Si
|-
| 38Al
| style="text-align:right" | 13
| style="text-align:right" | 25
| 38.0174(4)
| 9.0(7) ms
| β−
| 38Si
|
|
|
|-
| rowspan=2|39Al
| rowspan=2 style="text-align:right" | 13
| rowspan=2 style="text-align:right" | 26
| rowspan=2|39.02217(43)#
| rowspan=2|7.6(16) ms
| β−, n (90%)
| 38Si
| rowspan=2|5/2+#
| rowspan=2|
| rowspan=2|
|-
| β− (10%)
| 39Si
|-
| rowspan=3|40Al
| rowspan=3 style="text-align:right" | 13
| rowspan=3 style="text-align:right" | 27
| rowspan=3|40.02962(43)#
| rowspan=3|5.7(3 (stat), 2 (sys)) ms
| β−, n (64%)
| 39Si
| rowspan=3|
| rowspan=3|
| rowspan=3|
|-
| β−, 2n (20%)
| 38Si
|-
| β− (16%)
| 40Si
|-
| rowspan=3|41Al
| rowspan=3 style="text-align:right" | 13
| rowspan=3 style="text-align:right" | 28
| rowspan=3|41.03588(54)#
| rowspan=3|3.5(8 (stat), 4 (sys)) ms
| β−, n (86%)
| 40Si
| rowspan=3|5/2+#
| rowspan=3|
| rowspan=3|
|-
| β−, 2n (11%)
| 39Si
|-
| β− (3%)
| 41Si
|-
| 42Al
| style="text-align:right" | 13
| style="text-align:right" | 29
| 42.04305(64)#
| 1# ms [>170 ns]
| β−
| 42Si
|
|
|
|-
| 43Al
| style="text-align:right" | 13
| style="text-align:right" | 30
| 43.05048(86)#
| 1# ms [>170 ns]
| β−
| 43Si
| 
|
|

Aluminium-26 

Cosmogenic aluminium-26 was first described in studies of the Moon and meteorites. Meteorite fragments, after departure from their parent bodies, are exposed to intense cosmic-ray bombardment during their travel through space, causing substantial 26Al production. After falling to Earth, atmospheric shielding protects the meteorite fragments from further 26Al production, and its decay can then be used to determine the meteorite's terrestrial age. Meteorite research has also shown that 26Al was relatively abundant at the time of formation of our planetary system. Most meteoriticists believe that the energy released by the decay of 26Al was responsible for the melting and differentiation of some asteroids after their formation 4.55 billion years ago.

References

External links 
 Aluminum isotopes data from The Berkeley Laboratory Isotopes Project's

 
Aluminium
Aluminium